BMS Herlev, formerly known as Wolfpack, is a professional basketball team based in Ballerup, Denmark. The team was established in 2014, as a result of a merger between the local clubs Falcons, Glostrup IC and BMS Skovlunde. BMS Herlev plays in the Basketligaen, the highest level of national basketball.

Season by season

Players

References

Basketball teams in Denmark
Basketball teams established in 2014
Sports teams in Copenhagen
2014 establishments in Denmark